The following is a list of notable people from Damascus, Syria.

Ancient
 Abd ar-Rahman I - founder of Omayyad dynasty in Cordoba
 Ananias - one of the Seventy Disciples
 Apollodorus of Damascus - Syrian architect
 Ibn al-Nafis - polymath whose areas of work included medicine, surgery, physiology, anatomy,  biology, Islamic studies, jurisprudence, and philosophy. He is mostly famous for being the first to describe the pulmonary circulation of the blood.
Ibn al-Shatir was an astronomer, mathematician and engineer
 Ibn Qayyim al-Jawziyya - polymath
 Damascius - Byzantine philosopher
 Israel ben Moses Najara - poet, Kaballist and rabbi
 John of Damascus - Christian monk
 Nicolaus of Damascus - historian and philosopher
 Shams al-Din al-Ansari al-Dimashqi - Medieval Arab geographer
 Sophronius - Patriarch of Jerusalem

Modern
 Avraham Abaas - Israeli politician, member of the Knesset
 Michel Aflaq - political thinker and co-founder of the Baath Party
 Khalid al-Azm - former prime minister of Syria 
 Salah al-Din al-Bitar - political thinker and co-founder of the Baath Party
 Shukri al-Quwatli - former Syrian president and co-founder of the United Arab Republic
 Ghada al-Samman - novelist
 Ikram Antaki - Mexican writer
 Hanin Elias - member of punk rock band Atari Teenage Riot
 Sam Hamad - Quebec politician
 Izzat Husrieh - journalist and founder of the Syrian labor union
 Mohamed Haytham Khayat - Syrian physician and lexicographer
 Khaled Malas - Syrian Architect
 Abu Khalil Qabbani - Syrian playwright, considered the founder of Syrian theater
 Nizar Qabbani - poet
 Eliyahu Sasson - Israeli politician and minister 
 Rafik Schami - Syrian-German author
 Yasser Seirawan - chess player
Tahani Saker - entrepreneur and the Chief Executive Officer
 Zakaria Tamer - writer
 Soraya Tarzi - Queen of Afghanistan
 Samuel Vital - Kabalist
 Muna Wassef - actress and United Nations Goodwill ambassador
 Constantin Zureiq - academic intellectual and Arab nationalist

Families
Al-Asali
Alzahabi
Al-Azm
Al-Azma
Al-Ghazzi
Qabbani
Mardam-Bey
Al-Kanawati
Jabri
Al-Jabi
Estefan
Al-Dimashki

See also
List of rulers of Damascus
Al-Dimashqi

References

 
Damascus
Damascus